Miray Cin (born 5 July 2001) is a footballer who plays as a midfielder for MSV Duisburg in the German Frauen-Bundesliga. Born in Germany, she represents the Turkey national team, having previously been a member of the Germany national U15, U16, and U17 teams.

Personal life
Miray Cin was born in Bottrop, Germany on 5 July 2001. The -tall sportswoman is a dual citizen of the Federal Republic of Germany and the Republic of Turkey. She has two brothers, Oktay and Alpay.

Club career
Cin started her football career joining the under-17 team of SGS Essen in 2015. She has appeared in 28 games in three seasons, and has scored 11 goals. She was selected to the regional teams of Niederrhein U14 in 2015 playing in two matches, in U16 in 2016 playing in two matches, and U18 in 2017 appearing in five games. 

In the 2018–19 season, she moved to the reserve team of German top-level VfL Wolfsburg women's football team, where she netted two goals in 11 matches over two seasons. She then transferred to the Frauen-Bundesliga club MSV Duisburg by August 2020. In the 2020–21 season, she played in 7 matches and scored one goal.

International career

Germany
Cin played in four matches for the Germany U15 team scoring a goal between 2015 and 2016, and two matches for the Germany U16 team in 2016. End February 2018, she was called up to the Germany U17 team, and appeared also in seven games of the Germany U17 team.

Turkey
She was called up to the Turkey national team by September 2021. She internationally debuted in the 2023 FIFA World Cup qualification – UEFA Group H match against Portugal on 16 September 2021. She played in the international friendly match against Ukraine, Later, she took part at the matches against the Bulgarian and Serbian national teams in the 2023 World Cup qualification tournament.

References

2001 births
Living people
People from Bottrop
Sportspeople from Münster (region)
Footballers from North Rhine-Westphalia
German people of Turkish descent
Citizens of Turkey through descent
German women's footballers
Turkish women's footballers
Women's association football midfielders
Turkey women's international footballers
SGS Essen players
VfL Wolfsburg (women) players
MSV Duisburg (women) players
Frauen-Bundesliga players
Association football midfielders
Germany youth international footballers